Saccorhiza may refer to:

 Saccorhiza (alga), a genus of brown algae in the family Phyllariaceae
 Saccorhiza (foraminifera), a genus of foraminifera in the family Hippocrepinidae